Mahmudiye can refer to:

 Mahmudiye
 Mahmudiye, Alaca
 Mahmudiye, Ezine
Ottoman ship Mahmudiye
Ottoman ironclad Mahmudiye